Roxana Moslehi is an Iranian-born genetic epidemiologist.

Most of her research is dedicated to the study of cancer and cancer precursors.  Born in Iran and raised in Iran and Canada, she is currently an associate professor in Epidemiology and Biostatistics at the University at Albany, State University of New York (SUNY), where she has been teaching multiple courses, including those she developed in genetic and molecular epidemiology. Through her research she has been contributing to the understanding of hereditary causes of diseases as well as the influence of gene-environment interactions on the risk of developing disease.

Education
Roxana received her B.Sc. with honors, M.Sc. and Ph.D. degrees from the University of British Columbia (UBC) in Vancouver, Canada. Following her Ph.D. under the mentorship of Drs. J.M. Friedman and Steven Narod, she completed a postdoctoral fellowship at the National Institutes of Health (NIH), Division of Cancer Epidemiology and Genetics (DCEG) under the supervision of Mitchell Gail. While a postdoctoral fellow at the NIH, she received an adjunct assistant professor position at George Washington University (GWU), where she co-taught a course entitled "controversies in cancer epidemiology".

Research
The overarching theme of Roxana Moslehi's research has been identification and characterization of cancer susceptibility genes. Working with Drs. Steven Narod and J.M. Friedman, her study was among the first to estimate the penetrance of BRCA1 and BRCA2 mutations for breast, ovarian and other cancers in a study of Jewish women with ovarian cancer.  Roxana expanded her studies of breast and ovarian cancer to other populations, including those in the Middle East, some understudied at the time. For example, through collaboration with physicians in Iran, Moslehi conducted studies on hereditary breast and ovarian cancer families, which led to the discovery of a novel BRCA1 mutation in the Iranian population. 

Roxana has also made significant contributions to research on modifiers of BRCA-associated breast and ovarian cancer risk as well as to the understanding of mechanistic and population genetic aspects of the BRCA genes, now the most studied hereditary cancer predisposing genes in the human genome. In one such study, she investigated the impact of mutations in the BRCA1 and BRCA2 genes on female fertility as a potential mechanism influencing positive selection for BRCA mutations. More recently, Roxana led an integrative genomics study of common breast cancer, which identified two previously unreported low- to moderate-risk breast cancer susceptibility gene candidates.

Roxana Moslehi's hypotheses extend beyond the BRCA and other breast cancer susceptibility genes to genetic and biologic mechanisms involved in other cancers and disorders. Recently, she published a series of studies on the adverse effects of abnormalities in DNA repair and transcription genes on human reproduction and development. Based on her novel clinical observations in trichothiodystrophy (TTD) families, Roxana developed the hypothesis that defects in the nucleotide excision repair and transcription genes have adverse effects on human fetal and placental development. Subsequently, she proposed impairment of TFIIH-mediated function in transcription in placenta as one mechanism leading to gestational complications such as preeclampsia and highlighted the relevance of the fetal genotype and the exact genetic abnormality to this mechanism. In addition to breast and ovarian cancer, Roxana has been conducting genetic and epidemiologic investigations of other cancer and cancer precursors, such as Colorectal adenoma, Lung cancer and Non-Hodgkin lymphoma.

More recently, Moslehi was awarded a research grant from the National Institute of Allergy and Infectious Diseases (NIAID), NIH to conduct a study to explore the link between myalgic encephalomyelitis (ME)/chronic fatigue syndrome (CFS), autoimmune disorders, and cancer. In July 2021, Roxana gave a talk at a Sci Foo event organized by Google, Nature, and O’Reilly Media on the link between COVID-19 and ME/CFS.

Awards
Roxana Moslehi is a recipient of multiple awards and honors, including the Graduate Teaching Assistant Award for Excellence in Teaching (UBC), a Biovision Fellowship from Académie des Sciences (France), two Awards for Research Excellence from the NIH, and the Golden Apple Award for Excellence in Teaching from School of Public Health at SUNY Albany. Roxana also earned an invitation-only spot in the annual Science Foo Camp, where researchers, writers, educators, artists, policy makers, and investors exchange 'blue sky' ideas. In December 2021, Roxana Moslehi was named as one of the recipients of the NIH Director's Scientific/Medical Awards for her efforts as a member of the COVID-19 Contact Investigations Team.

References

Canadian expatriate academics in the United States
Iranian biologists
Iranian women scientists
Iranian emigrants to Canada
Year of birth missing (living people)
Living people
Iranian oncologists
Canadian women biologists
Genetic epidemiologists
Biostatisticians
Women statisticians
Canadian oncologists
Women oncologists
Iranian women physicians
Canadian women physicians
Canadian women epidemiologists
20th-century Iranian physicians
20th-century Canadian physicians
20th-century Canadian biologists
20th-century Canadian women scientists
21st-century Canadian physicians
21st-century Canadian biologists
21st-century Canadian women scientists
University at Albany, SUNY faculty